The following highways are numbered 517:

Ireland
 R517 regional road

United States